Charlotte Lecocq (born 17 July 1977) is a French politician of La République En Marche! (LREM) who was elected to the French National Assembly on 18 June 2017, representing the department of Nord.

In parliament, Lecocq serves on the Committee on Social Affairs. In addition to her committee assignments, she is a member of the French-Venezuelan Parliamentary Friendship Group.

See also
 2017 French legislative election

References

1977 births
Living people
Deputies of the 15th National Assembly of the French Fifth Republic
La République En Marche! politicians
21st-century French women politicians
People from Pointe-à-Pitre
Women members of the National Assembly (France)
Members of Parliament for Nord